FPJ's Ang Probinsyano ( / International title: Brothers) was a 2015 Philippine action drama television series, based on the 1997 Fernando Poe Jr. film of the same title, courtesy of FPJ Productions. The series premiered on ABS-CBN's Primetime Bida evening block and worldwide via The Filipino Channel from September 28, 2015 to August 12, 2022, replacing Nathaniel and replaced by Mars Ravelo's Darna on August 15, 2022. A total of 1,696 episodes of Ang Probinsyano have aired.

The series is streaming online on YouTube. with english subtitles.

Series overview
Ang Probinsyano has five narrative arcs or "books". Consisting of 9 seasons throughout its telecast.

The first book (Syndicate Arc) ran from 2015 through 2017 spanning the first and second seasons and focused on the various cases Cardo encountered as a member of the CIDG, both related and unrelated to its main arc.

The second book (Rebellion and Terrorism Arc) contains the third and fourth seasons of the series and focused on Cardo's encounters with the "Pulang Araw" both as a member of Special Action Force and undercover under the no nom de guerre "Agila", and later as part of the vigilante group "Vendetta".

The third book (Political Arc) covers the series' fifth and sixth seasons and focuses on the larger political drama in the Philippines.

The fourth book (Crime and Corruption Arc), on the other hand, opened with the series' seventh season and chronicles Cardo's return to the police force and his continued efforts to fight crime and corruption in the country. This is followed by the show's eight season which sees Lily moving to consolidate her power as both the first lady of the Republic and leader of an international drug cartel in the Philippines.

The fifth and final book (International Arc) follows the series' ninth season, the Task Force Agila traveling to north in search for a new hiding place after killing the drug lord Enrique Vera, having avenged the murder of Audrey, the sister of P/Cpt. Lia Mante and daughter of Fernando Mante, in ninth season. The Mante family leaves the country for their safety. Arriving at the north, Cardo meets a woman in a motorcycle named Mara.

Episodes

Book 1 (2015–2017)

Season 1 (2015–2016)

</table>

Season 2: Ang Bagong Yugto (2016–2017)

Book 2 (2017–2018)

Season 3 (2017)

Season 4 (2017–2018)

Book 3 (2018–2019)

Season 5 (2018)

Season 6 (2018–2019)

Book 4 (2019–2021)

Season 7 (2019–2020)

Season 8: Tuloy Ang Laban (2020–2021)

Book 5 (2021–2022)

Season 9 (2021–2022)

Notes

See also
 List of Ang Probinsyano guest stars
 List of Ang Probinsyano characters

References

External links

Lists of action television series episodes
Lists of crime drama television series episodes
Lists of Philippine drama television series episodes